Moreshwar Vasudeo Abhyankar (19 August 1886 – 2 January 1935) was a lawyer, freedom fighter, and a Tilakite member of Indian National Congress from Nagpur. Moreshwar Vasudev Abhyankar was a home rule activist from vidharbh.

References

1886 births
1935 deaths
Scholars from Nagpur
Indian independence activists from Maharashtra
Marathi people
20th-century Indian lawyers
Indian National Congress politicians from Maharashtra
Politicians from Nagpur